Gianluca Iannucci (born 18 June 2001), is an Australian footballer who plays as a forward for Green Gully.

Club career

Melbourne City
Iannucci was part of Melbourne City's senior squad, contracted on a scholarship contract until the end of the 2019–20 A-League season.
In September 2020, Iannucci was released by Melbourne City at the end of his contract.

Melbourne Victory
Iannucci was announced as part of Melbourne Victory's 2020 AFC Champions League squad on 18 November 2020. On 24 November 2020 he made his professional debut in their clash against Beijing Sinobo Guoan. In December, it was confirmed that he is signed for the A-League season too.

Honours

International
Australia U20
AFF U-19 Youth Championship: 2019

References

External links

2001 births
Living people
Australian soccer players
Association football forwards
Melbourne City FC players
Melbourne Victory FC players
National Premier Leagues players
Australian people of Italian descent